Muramoto (written: 村元 or 村本) is a Japanese surname. Notable people with the surname include:

, Japanese photojournalist
, Japanese figure skater
, Japanese figure skater
, Japanese judoka

Japanese-language surnames